This is a list of historic counties of Wales, ordered by population as at the 1971 census.

References
1971 census

1971 United Kingdom census
Population
1971 in Wales